The Volunteer Defense Corps (abbreviated VDC) is a paramilitary under the authority of the Department of Provincial Administration (DOPA), Ministry of Interior. It was founded in 1954 to provide extra military support to the Royal Thai Armed Forces and to protect local civilians living near Thailand's borders.

History
The Volunteer Defense Corps (colloquially called Or Sor in Thailand) was formally established on 10 February 1954 by the Thai Border Patrol Police (BPP) in response to complaints by civilians of banditry and harassment by insurgent and separatist organizations. Originally, the VDC's purpose was to protect civilians from insurgents who had crossed into Thai border provinces from neighboring Cambodia, Laos, and Malaysia. VDC members were trained by the BPP and sent to protect civilians and farms from extortion and attacks by insurgents.

In 1974, the VDC was expanded by the Internal Security Operations Command (ISOC) to urban areas to fight communist insurgents. In the late-1980s, VDC strength was estimated at 33,000, down from a peak of about 52,000 in 1980. Part of the decrease in numbers was due to the formation of the Thahan Phran, a paramilitary unit formed to counter communist insurgents, which absorbed some units of the VDC.

Since 2004, the VDC has had a major role in fighting the South Thailand insurgency.

Volunteer Defense Corps ranks 

Officers

Enlisted

References

1954 establishments in Thailand
Law enforcement in Thailand
Military units and formations established in 1954
Paramilitary organizations based in Thailand